The Caracciolo Parra Olmedo Municipality is one of the 23 municipalities (municipios) that makes up the Venezuelan state of Mérida and, according to a 2007 population estimate by the National Institute of Statistics of Venezuela, the municipality has a population of 28,055.  The town of Tucaní is the shire town of the Caracciolo Parra Olmedo Municipality.

Demographics
The Caracciolo Parra Olmedo Municipality, according to a 2007 population estimate by the National Institute of Statistics of Venezuela, has a population of 28,055 (up from 23,220 in 2000). This amounts to 3.3% of the state's population.

Government
The mayor of the Caracciolo Parra Olmedo Municipality is Yaritza Giorgina Romero de Camacho, re-elected on October 31, 2004, with 50% of the vote.  The municipality is divided into two parishes; Capital Caracciolo Parra Olmedo and Florencio Ramírez.

See also
Tucaní
Mérida
Municipalities of Venezuela

References

Municipalities of Mérida (state)